Envela Corporation, incorporated on September 17, 1965, is a holding company owning subsidiaries engaged in various business activities with a focus on recommerce. Envela's segments include retail stores, e-commerce, de-manufacturing, recycling, IT asset disposition (ITAD), and reverse logistics. Envela Corporation is divided into two sectors: DGSE, LLC and ECHG.

DGSE, LLC is the retail sector that buys and sells jewelry and bullion products to individual consumers, dealers, and institutions in the United States by employing a wide range of authenticators and experts who inspect items for authenticity and value. DGSE, LLC owns and operates Dallas Gold & Silver Exchange and Charleston Gold & Diamond Exchange. Dallas Gold & Silver Exchange has multiple locations across the Dallas/Fort Worth metroplex. Their flagship location is in the heart of Dallas at Preston Rd. and LBJ Freeway. Their other locations are in Euless and Grand Prairie, and soon they will be opening stores in Lewisville and Grapevine. Charleston Gold & Diamond Exchange is located in Mt. Pleasant, South Carolina.

ECHG provides solutions to businesses from across all industries seeking sustainable ways to reduce waste and protect their intellectual property and brand value. ECHG's ITAD, re-marketing, and reverse supply chain services help clients maximize the value of their end-of-life electronics while safeguarding the data stored on these devices. The de-manufacturing and value recovery business is a provider of services and solutions to industrial and commercial users of electronic components.

History
Envela Corporation, formerly known as DGSE Companies, Inc., announced their name change in 2019.

Originally known as American Pacific Mint Inc., they incorporated in Nevada in September 1965, and later moved to Azusa, California. They purchased Dallas Gold and Silver Exchange in September 1987 for an undisclosed amount. Dallas Gold and Silver Exchange continued operating as a subsidiary of American Pacific Mint. In January 1992, after seeing that subsidiary achieve record results and a 19% jump in profits, American Pacific Mint announced their plan to move their headquarters to Dallas and rename the entire company as Dallas Gold and Silver Exchange. Shareholders approved the plan in July that year. In July 2001, they began to use their present name.

DGSE was one of the earliest coin and bullion dealers to begin doing business on the internet; they set up a website to auction jewelry from their stores in 1995, and later launched two further websites for auctioning watches and to allow jewelry manufactures and vendors to sell to each other and directly to the public. They also set up a website to provide real-time price quotes for precious metals. Their revenues from their internet business began to show dramatic growth in 1999; revenue to March 15 of that year was five times the revenue for their 1998 fiscal year. Their acquisition of Superior Galleries, and the success of Superior's first auction under DGSE ownership, drove their share price up 33% to $4.06 in August 2007.

In April 2012 DGSE Announces Halt in Trading of its public stock on AMEX   

In June 2012, DGSE closes its Superior Gold and Silver Exchange store in Woodland Hills.

In July 2012, DGSE opens two new stores in the Dallas-Fort Worth Metroplex: Southlake, TX and Allen, TX.

In November 2012, DGSE opened a new store in Fort Worth, TX 

In November 2012, DGSE Companies Announces the Resumption of Trading of its public stock on NYSE MKT.

Timeline
1965 – Incorporation of American Pacific Mint

1978 – Rainbow Rare Coins founded

1980 – Rainbow Rare Coins changes name to Dallas Gold & Silver Exchange

1987 – Publicly traded American Pacific Mint acquires the assets of Dallas Gold & Silver Exchange

1991 – Dallas Gold & Silver Exchange acquires its first Texas pawn license to provide jewelry loans to its customers

1995 – Dallas Gold & Silver Exchange launches online auction platform

1998 – Dallas Gold & Silver Exchange acquires National Jewelry Exchange a small pawnshop in Carrollton, Texas

2000 – Dallas Gold & Silver Exchange opens Charleston, South Carolina location under the name Charleston Gold & Diamond Exchange

2000 – Dallas Gold & Silver Exchange acquires Fairchild International, one of the largest wholesale fine watch companies in the United States

2003 – U.S. Bullion Exchange is launched to handle trading and execution of all precious metals transactions system-wide for all DGSE Companies. USBE provides an Internet-based trading platform for all DGSE customers.

2005 – Parent company's name changed to DGSE Companies, Inc

2007 – Dallas Gold & Silver Exchange acquires the assets of Euless Gold & Silver and opens Dallas Gold & Silver Exchange Fort Worth/Euless location

2007 – DGSE Companies, Inc. lists on the American Stock Exchange

2007 – The second Dallas area National Pawn store is opened.

2007 – American Gold & Silver Exchange is launched with national advertising roll-out allowing individuals from anywhere to send jewelry and precious metals to DGSE for purchase.

2007 – Superior Estate Buyers is launched and conducts its first remote buying events

2007 – DGSE Companies, Inc. acquires Superior Galleries, one of the United States' oldest and largest numismatic auction houses

2007 – Superior Galleries conducts its first jewelry and fine timepiece auction in Beverly Hills, California

2007 – Superior Precious Metals is launched to service precious metals and rare coin retail customers

2008 – Superior Gold & Diamond Exchange is opened in Woodland Hills, California

2009 – DGSE Companies, Inc. launches a charitable fundraising company under the name A Chance To Give

2011 – DGSE Bullion Express concept is introduced, the new store opened in Preston Center in Dallas, Texas

2011 – Second DGSE Bullion Express is opened in North Dallas.

2011 – DGSE Companies, Inc. opens a fifth Dallas-area location in Arlington

2012 – DGSE Companies, Inc. opens a "Bullion Express" store in Highland Park (near Chicago), Illinois

2012 – DGSE Companies, Inc. opens a "Bullion Express" store in Atlanta, Georgia's Buckhead district

2012 – Securities and Exchange Commission (SEC) announces investigation into DGSE accounting irregularities

2012 – DGSE Companies, Inc. opens 6th DFW area location in Southlake, Texas

2012 – DGSE Companies, Inc. opens 7th DFW area location in Allen, Texas

2012 – DGSE Companies, Inc. opens 8th DFW area location in Fort Worth, Texas Using some artwork and jewelry cases from the now-defunct Superior Galleries.

2013 – DGSE Companies, Inc. opens 2nd Atlanta area location in Cumming, Georgia; branded as Southern Bullion Coin & Jewelry

2016 – John Loftus is appointed CEO, President and Chairman of the Board of DGSE Companies, Inc.

2019 – DGSE Companies, Inc. changes its name to Envela Corporation. Changes NYSE stock ticker from DGSE to ELA.

2020 – ECHG, LLC, a subsidiary of Envela Corporation agrees to lend $1.5MM to CExchange, LLC, and warrant and call-option agreements to acquire all of CExchange's equity interests.

2020 – DGSE, LLC, an Envela subsidiary, opens new Dallas Gold & Silver Exchange location in Lewisville, Texas.

References

Jewelry retailers of the United States
Wholesalers of the United States
American companies established in 1965
Clothing companies established in 1965
Design companies established in 1965
Retail companies established in 1965
Bullion dealers
Companies listed on NYSE American
1965 establishments in Texas